The women's 1500 metres (T54) at the 2018 Commonwealth Games, as part of the athletics programme, took place in the Carrara Stadium on 10 April 2018. The event was open to para-sport athletes competing under the T53 / T54 classifications.

Records
Prior to this competition, the existing world and Games records were as follows:

Schedule
The schedule was as follows:

All times are Australian Eastern Standard Time (UTC+10)

Results
With eight entrants, the event was held as a straight final.

Final

References

Women's 1500 metres (T54)
2018 in women's athletics